Giuseppe Verdi, released theatrically in the US as The Life and Music of Giuseppe Verdi and on video as Verdi, the King of Melody, is a 1953 Italian biographical musical melodrama film starring Pierre Cressoy and directed by Raffaello Matarazzo. It is based on adult life events of the composer  Giuseppe Verdi. The film was a commercial success, grossing over 957 million lire at the Italian  box office.

Cast 

Pierre Cressoy as Giuseppe Verdi
Anna Maria Ferrero as Margherita Barezzi
Gaby André as  Giuseppina Strepponi
Irene Genna as Violetta
Laura Gore as  Berberina Strepponi
Camillo Pilotto as Antonio Barezzi
Emilio Cigoli as Gaetano Donizetti
Loris Gizzi as Gioachino Rossini
Mario Del Monaco as  Francesco Tamagno
Tito Gobbi as  Domenico Ronconi
Aldo Bufi Landi as  Alexandre Dumas, fils
Guido Celano as  Victor Hugo 
Franca Dominici as  Rossini's Wife
Mario Ferrari as Austrian Official
Enrico Glori as  Stage Director
Turi Pandolfini as  Bank Teller 
Teresa Franchini as Old Lady
Gianni Agus 
Olga Vittoria Gentili 
Liana Del Balzo 
Lola Braccini 
Anna Vivaldi 
Lucia Banti

References

External links

1953 films
1950s biographical drama films
1950s historical musical films
Italian musical drama films
Italian historical musical films
Films directed by Raffaello Matarazzo
Films set in the 19th century
Films about classical music and musicians
Films about composers
Italian biographical drama films
Cultural depictions of Giuseppe Verdi
Cultural depictions of Victor Hugo
Alexandre Dumas
1950s musical drama films
1953 drama films
Melodrama films
1950s Italian films